William Frederick Baldock (1 August 1900 – 30 December 1941) was an English cricketer who played ten first-class matches for Somerset County Cricket Club from 1920 to 1936.  A right-handed batsman, his top-score for Somerset was 63 not out, made against the Indians in 1936.

William Baldock was the son of Colonel William Stanford Baldock and Mary. Baldock was working in Malaya as a Conservator of Forests and was serving as a Private with the 2nd (Selangor) Battalion, Federated Malay States Volunteer Force when he died on 30 December 1941, aged 41.

References

External links
 
 

1900 births
1941 deaths
Military personnel from Somerset
English cricketers
Somerset cricketers
People from Wellington, Somerset
British Malaya military personnel of World War II
British colonial army soldiers
British military personnel killed in World War II